Merit School of Music is a nonprofit organization located in Chicago, Illinois, United States. Merit is dedicated to helping young people transform their lives by removing barriers to a high-quality music education, with nearly 70 percent of students benefitting from need-based financial aid and low-cost instrument rental. Merit enables motivated students, regardless of economic circumstance, to develop their talent and to use music as a springboard for achieving their full personal potential, with virtually 100 percent of conservatory graduates going onto college.

Merit School of Music is a member of the National Guild of Community Schools of the Arts, Illinois Arts Alliance, Illinois Alliance for Arts in Education, Chicago Consortium of Community Music Schools, and the Chicago Music Alliance.

History 
Merit School of Music was founded in 1979 by Alice S. Pfaelzer and Emma Endres-Kountz in response to the elimination of music education from the Chicago Public Schools' elementary school curriculum.  They had borrowed space from Roosevelt University for their tuition-free conservatory program, held on Saturday afternoons. Two years later Merit's growing enrollment created the need for a larger space and the school was moved to Chicago's Fine Arts Building.  In 1987, Merit moved again to the basement of the Dearborn Station in Chicago's Printer's Row neighborhood. This location remained the school's home for the next 18 years.

By 2005, the school needed more room to accommodate its student body.  After a $19 million capital campaign, Merit purchased an old TV studio in Chicago's West Loop and underwent extensive renovations to make the building musically equipped.  The building is named the Joy Faith Knapp Music Center. It was named in honor of Joy Faith Knapp, a young businesswoman who died of lupus. It is located on 38 South Peoria Street.

Programs 
The Alice S. Pfaelzer Tuition-free Conservatory is Merit's most advanced musical program, it is named after one of Merit's founders, Alice S. Pfaelzer.  The Tuition-free Conservatory is for high intermediate to advanced students with at least three years of experience on their instrument.  Students meet for 26 Saturdays during the school year for three to nine hours.

The Instrumental & Vocal Music Program (group classes) is an after-school program that includes instrumental and vocal instruction, music theory classes, and large ensembles.  The program prepares students for entrance into Merit's most advanced program, the Alice S. Pfaelzer Tuition-free Conservatory.

The Private Lesson Program is offered on all instruments in both classical and jazz music and in ethnic drumming.  Private Lesson students perform at an annual recital and have opportunities for performance and competition throughout the year. Merit's Private Lesson Program is an option for adult music students.  Merit is located in the West Loop and offers lessons on weekends and weekdays during after-work hours.  An optional end-of-year recital is available for students.

Merit Music in Communities (formerly known as Bridges) brings music instruction into more than 30 public, parochial, charter and private schools, and community centers, each week.  Each program is designed in consultation with the Principal or Site Director. Merit Music in Communities offers group instruction on instruments, as well as in general music, early childhood, musical theatre and chorus. Band and string orchestra programs are also available. Students have the opportunity to continue their musical studies and further develop their technical and musical skills in one of Merit's on-site programs.

Merit's Early Childhood program supports a child's first steps in music. It incorporates song, chant, movement exercises, and instrument play.

Alegre Strings is an all-violin performing ensemble with weekly rehearsal classes. Students are instructed using the Suzuki method. As the students progress in their studies, they continue with classical pieces and also incorporate the folk songs of Latin America. Performances are a central component of Alegre Strings. Students in the Alegre Strings program have performed for Presidente Fox of Mexico, NBC News, Fox News, WGN News, and have been featured in articles in Chicago Parent, The Chicago Tribune, Exito, and Ladies Home Journal. All Alegre Strings students perform in the Alegre Stringtacular – part of an all-day festival sponsored by Univision. Held in June at Harrison Park, the concert features all 150+ Alegre Strings students from around the city performing 35+ pieces in unison from memory. 

Regenstein Scholarship Program - students living in Chicago Housing Authority communities, or other government-subsidized housing, are eligible to apply for the Regenstein Scholarship Program. The Regenstein Scholarship Program is dedicated to the musical and personal development of children who live in Chicago's public housing communities. In addition to a financial award, selected Regenstein Scholars receive an instrument for use while enrolled at Merit, musical supplies, and public transportation tickets to and from Merit obligations.  Students and families receive additional staff support to help guide them through their Merit experience.  Instruction for beginning music students, including early childhood programs, is available.

National Advisory Board 
Sergio Assad
Emanuel Ax
Daniel Barenboim
James DePreist
Christoph Eschenbach
Paul Freeman
Miriam Fried
Lynn Harrell
Hyo Kang
Ramsey Lewis
Yo-Yo Ma
Catherine Malfitano
Robert McDonald
Sylvia McNair
Midori Goto
Samuel Ramey
Leonard Slatkin
André Watts

References

External links
 Merit School of Music website

Music schools in Illinois
Non-profit organizations based in Chicago